This is a list of theatre list articles on Wikipedia. Theatre or theater is a collaborative form of fine art that uses live performers to present the experience of a real or imagined event before a live audience in a specific place. The performers may communicate this experience to the audience through combinations of gesture, speech, song, music, and dance. Elements of design and stagecraft are used to enhance the physicality, presence and immediacy of the experience.

By city

 List of theatres in Bangkok
 List of theatres and concert halls in Barcelona
 List of former theatres in Boston
 List of theatres in Budapest
 List of theatres in Bristol
 List of theaters in Chicago
 List of theatres in Hamburg 
 List of former theatres in London
 List of theatres in Louisville, Kentucky
 List of theatres and entertainment venues in Lyon
 List of theatres in Munich
 Early theatres in Naples
 List of theaters in Omaha, Nebraska
 List of theatres and entertainment venues in Paris
List of theatres in Ponce, Puerto Rico
 List of theatres and opera houses in Rome
 List of theatres in Saint Petersburg
 List of theatres in San Francisco
 List of theatres and opera houses in Venice
 List of theaters in Washington, D.C.

By country 

 List of theatres in Albania
 List of theatres in China
 List of English Renaissance theatres
 List of theatres in Hungary
 List of Irish theatres and theatre companies
 List of theatres in North Korea
 List of theatres in Norway
 List of theatres in Scotland
 List of theatres in Serbia
 List of arts and entertainment venues in Singapore
 List of theatres and concert halls in Spain
 List of theatres in the United Kingdom
 List of theatres in Wales

United States

 List of theatres in California
 List of theaters in Colorado
 List of theaters in Illinois
 List of theaters in Kentucky
 List of theaters in Louisiana
 List of theaters in Maryland
 List of theaters in Michigan
 List of theaters in Minnesota
 List of theatres in New York
 List of theaters in North Carolina
 List of theaters in Ohio
 List of theaters in Washington, D.C.
 List of Theatre Communications Group member theatres

By type

 List of ancient Greek theatres
 List of theaters for dance
 List of dinner theaters
 List of drive-in theaters
 List of national theatres
 List of opera houses

See also 

 Outline of theatre

References

 
Lists of entertainment lists